Great Britain, or in full Great Britain and Northern Ireland, represented by the British Olympic Association (BOA), competed at the 2016 Summer Olympics in Rio de Janeiro, Brazil, from 5 to 21 August 2016 and the team of selected athletes was officially known as Team GB. British athletes have appeared in every Summer Olympic Games of the modern era, alongside Australia, France, Greece, and Switzerland, though Great Britain is the only country to have won at least one gold medal at all of them. The team represented the United Kingdom, the three Crown Dependencies, and the thirteen British Overseas Territories, ten of whom sent representatives.

These Games were the most successful for Great Britain since 1908, winning a total of 67 medals, which exceeded its London 2012 tally of 65 medals, therefore becoming the first nation to surpass its medal total at the Olympics immediately following one that it hosted. Great Britain also became one of only two nations (the other being Azerbaijan) ever to increase the number of medals achieved in five consecutive Games. In all, Great Britain finished second in gold medals to the United States, and third in overall medals after the United States and China. Great Britain won gold medals across more different sports than any other nation at the Games. Great Britain also topped the medal tables in cycling, sailing, triathlon, golf and rowing, and won first ever golds in golf, diving and gymnastics. Great Britain successfully defended 18 of the gold medals they had won in London.

In cycling, male cyclist Jason Kenny won three gold medals, placing him alongside Sir Chris Hoy as the joint-most successful British Olympian. Sir Bradley Wiggins won his fifth gold and eighth overall medal, making him the most decorated British Olympian. Laura Trott won two gold medals to become Britain's most successful female Olympian with a total of four golds; dressage rider Charlotte Dujardin's gold medal had briefly placed her in first. Katherine Grainger's fifth consecutive medal, a silver, made her Britain's joint most decorated female Olympian, and made her one of only five British Olympians to win medals in five consecutive Games. Trott, Dujardin, taekwondo-ka Jade Jones and boxer Nicola Adams became the first British female Olympians ever to successfully defend individual Olympic titles.

Gymnast Max Whitlock won Britain's first ever gold medals in gymnastics, in men's floor and pommel horse, and four golds were claimed in rowing. Alistair Brownlee became the first triathlete to successfully defend an Olympic title. In athletics, in both the men's 5,000 and 10,000 metres, Mo Farah successfully defended his Olympic titles to become Britain's most successful ever athlete in the discipline. Christine Ohorougu became the second British track and field athlete to win medals in three successive Games.

In swimming, Adam Peaty won gold in the 100 metres breaststroke, the first British male swimmer to win gold since 1988. Jack Laugher and Chris Mears became Britain's first Olympic diving champions. Giles Scott won his fifth consecutive gold medal in the Finn sailing class, while Nick Dempsey became the most decorated windsurfer in Olympic history with his third medal, a silver. In the first Olympic men's golf tournament for 100 years, Justin Rose claimed the gold medal. In the women's field hockey, Great Britain won the country's first gold medal in a team sport at a Summer Olympics for 28 years.

Medallists

|  style="text-align:left; width:78%; vertical-align:top;"|

|  style="text-align:left; width:22%; vertical-align:top;"|

* – Indicates the athlete competed in preliminaries but not the final

Multiple medallists
The following Team GB competitors won several medals at the 2016 Olympic Games.

Administration
On 29 April 2014, the British Olympic Association announced the appointment of Mark England as Chef-de-Mission to the British Olympic team at Rio 2016.

Medal and performance targets
UK Sport targeted 47 medals for Rio, the highest target ever for an away Olympics, following the success of the 2012 Games in London. The GB squad surpassed this target on 17 August

Funding
As with previous games, UK Sport was the body responsible for allocating elite funding for Olympic sports. In December 2012, a record £347 million of funding for Olympic and Paralympic athletes was announced with the aim of becoming the first nation in recent history to win more medals at the Games following being the host nation.

Four sports, basketball, synchronised swimming, water polo, and weightlifting, initially had all their funding withdrawn, while swimming and badminton had their funding cut. Following an appeal process weightlifting had its funding restored.

The Sport and Recreation Alliance, an umbrella body that represents national sports organisations in Britain, raised concerns about how the Scottish independence referendum, which took place on 18 September 2014, would affect sport funding and recognition issues for Scottish athletes who aim to compete at the Olympic Games.

Competitors
Nick Skelton, the show jumper, participated at his seventh Olympic Games, a record for a British competitor. He celebrated this achievement by becoming the first British rider to win an individual gold medal in jumping.

The team included seven sets of siblings: Alistair and Jonathan Brownlee (Triathlon), Peter and Richard Chambers (Rowing), Ellie and Rebecca Downie (Gymnastics), Callum and Derek Hawkins (Athletics), Andy and Jamie Murray (Tennis), Cindy Ofili and Tiffany Porter (Athletics), and John and Michael Whitaker (Equestrian). There were also two married couples: Chris and Gabby Adcock (Badminton) and Helen and Kate Richardson-Walsh (Hockey). Mark Gleghorne (Hockey) competed for Great Britain while his brother Paul competed for Ireland in the same sport.

|  style="text-align:left; width:78%; vertical-align:top;"|
The following is a list of the number of competitors participating in the Games. Note that reserves in fencing, field hockey, football, and handball are not counted as athletes:

Archery

One British archer qualified for the men's individual recurve at the Olympics by securing one of three available Olympic spots at the 2016 European Championships in Nottingham. Meanwhile, another British archer was added to the squad by virtue of a top six national finish in the women's individual recurve at the 2016 Archery World Cup meet in Antalya, Turkey.

Athletics

Great Britain secured a place in all relay events with the exception of the men's 4 × 100 m relay based on the team's performance at the 2015 IAAF World Relays, before securing a place in the final relay in July 2016 by their position in world rankings. British athletes have so far achieved qualifying standards in the following athletics events (up to a maximum of 3 athletes in each event): The team nominated its athletes with an entry standard for the individual events based on the results at the British Championships, scheduled to take place in Birmingham between 24 and 26 June 2016.

On 24 April 2016, the top two finishers in both the men's and women's 2016 London Marathon won automatic places for Team GB at the Olympics. Two days later, British Athletics confirmed four athletes, and added Derek Hawkins, brother of Callum to the men's marathon, and race walker Dominic King to the  walk.

On 21 May 2016, the Great Britain trials were held for the 10,000 metres, with two places in both the men's and women's races available to the first two across the line, if they had the qualification time. In the women's race, Jess Andrews won in the qualification time, while Beth Potter, who already had the time, came second and also earned a place in Rio. Mo Farah, reigning World and Olympic champion at 5000 and 10,000 metres, has been preselected by Great Britain for both men's races. Neither of the first two finishers in the men's race had at that point achieved the qualifying standard, but on 11 June 2016, Ross Millington, who won the trial, managed to also  beat the standard, thus confirming his Olympic place.

On 29 May 2016, Katarina Johnson-Thompson achieved the qualification mark in heptathlon at the Gotzis meeting, the designated Olympic trial for Great Britain, joining the pre-selected Jessica Ennis-Hill in that event.

Following the end of the qualifying period on 11 July, a total of 80 athletes (41 men and 39 women) were officially named to Team GB's track and field team for the Games. Apart from Ennis-Hill and Farah, notable athletes also featured defending Olympic long jump champion Greg Rutherford, two-time medalist Christine Ohuruogu, high jump bronze medalist Robbie Grabarz, Sudanese-born sprinter Rabah Yousif, and long-distance stalwart Jo Pavey, who is set to compete at her fifth Games in the 10,000 metres.

Track & road events
Men

 * : Seb Rodger originally advanced as the last of the 'fastest losers' to the semifinal, but was excluded after a successful appeal by another runner against disqualification.
 ** : Charlie Grice was reinstated for the semi-finals following an appeal after obstruction in the heat.
 *** : Chijindu Ujah raced in heat but not in final.

Women

 * : Kelly Massey raced in heat but not in final.

Field events
Men

Women

Combined events – Women's heptathlon

Badminton

Great Britain qualified a total of eight badminton players for each of the following events into the Olympic tournament based on the BWF World Rankings as of 5 May 2016: one entry each in the men's and women's singles, and a pair in the men's, women's, and mixed doubles.

Boxing

Great Britain entered twelve boxers to compete in each of the following weight classes into the Olympic boxing tournament. Galal Yafai, Muhammad Ali, Qais Ashfaq, Joseph Cordina, Antony Fowler, Joshua Buatsi, Lawrence Okolie, and Joseph Joyce claimed their Olympic spots at the 2016 European Qualification Tournament in Samsun, Turkey.

London 2012 flyweight champion Nicola Adams and fellow Olympian Savannah Marshall were the only British women to book Olympic spots, as a result of their quarterfinal victories at the World Championships in Astana, Kazakhstan. Pat McCormack and Josh Kelly secured further Olympic places for Team GB at the 2016 AIBA World Qualifying Tournament in Baku, Azerbaijan.

Men

Women

Canoeing

Slalom
British canoeists qualified a maximum of one boat in each of the following classes through the 2015 ICF Canoe Slalom World Championships and the Olympic selection trials, both held in Lee Valley Park. On 4 November 2015, Team GB announced the names of the four slalom canoeists selected for the Games.

Sprint
British canoeists qualified one boat in each of the following events through the 2015 ICF Canoe Sprint World Championships and the Olympic selection trials, held in Duisburg (18 to 19 April 2016). Under Olympic rules, the successful canoeists could also enter other events where no Team GB canoeist was separately entered. As a result, Liam Heath, a World Cup gold medalist in the K-1 200 m, would take part in that event, and this was confirmed on 14 June 2016, as well as the participation of Jessica Walker in the equivalent women's event under the same rule. On 18 July 2016, as a consequence of the disqualification of the Romanian and Belarusian squads from the Games, Lani Belcher and Angela Hannah, as highest ranked non-qualifier in the 2015 World Championships, were upgraded to a quota place in the K2-500 event.

Men

Women

Qualification Legend: FA = Qualify to final (medal); FB = Qualify to final B (non-medal)

Cycling

Road
British riders qualified for the following quota places in the men's and women's Olympic road race by virtue of their top 15 final national ranking in the 2015 UCI World Tour (for men) and top 22 in the UCI World Ranking (for women).

The BOA announced the eight-athlete squad of road racers (five men and three women) for Team GB on 24 June 2016. On 19 July, it was announced that Peter Kennaugh had withdrawn from the squad due to a lack of race fitness after struggling to recover from injuries sustained in May and that his place in the squad would be taken by Steve Cummings.

Men

Women

Track
Following the completion of the 2016 UCI Track Cycling World Championships, British riders accumulated spots in both men's and women's team pursuit, and men's team sprint, as well as both the men's and women's omnium. As a result of their place in the men's team sprint, Great Britain won the right to enter two riders in both men's sprint and men's keirin.

Great Britain narrowly failed to win a quota place in the women's team sprint. As such, they did not earn the two places in women's sprint and keirin that the team quota place would have gained them. However, Great Britain did earn a single place in the women's keirin, and two places in the women's sprint, by virtue of their final individual UCI Olympic rankings in those events.

Team GB's track cycling squad was officially selected for the Games on 24 June 2016, with seven-time medallist Bradley Wiggins returning to the track scene at his fifth straight Olympics.

Sprint

Team sprint

Qualification legend: FA=Gold medal final; FB=Bronze medal final

Pursuit

Keirin

Omnium

Mountain biking
Great Britain received a spare Olympic berth freed up by Sweden from the UCI to send a mountain biker competing in the Olympic men's cross-country race. On 4 July 2016, British Cycling announced that Grant Ferguson was officially added to the cycling squad for the Games.

BMX
British riders qualified for two men's quota places in BMX at the Olympics, as a result of the nation's fifth-place finish in the UCI Olympic Ranking List of 31 May 2016. Team GB selected London 2012 top 8 finalist Liam Phillips and rookie Kyle Evans to the BMX cycling team for the Games on 24 June 2016.

Diving

British divers qualified for seven of the maximum of eight individual spots and four synchronized teams at the Olympics through the 2015 FINA World Championships and the 2016 FINA World Cup series. The divers who secured the places for Great Britain were not necessarily the athletes who would be selected to represent their country in these events. Instead, they needed to compete at the Olympic trials, held from 10 to 12 June 2016 in Sheffield, to book their places for the Games. A total of eleven divers (five men and six women) were officially named to Team GB on 17 June 2016, featuring London 2012 bronze medalist Tom Daley in both men's individual and synchronized platform.

Men

Women

Equestrian

Great Britain became one of the first three nations to earn places at the Games, qualifying a complete team in dressage by winning the silver medal in the team event at the 2014 FEI World Equestrian Games.
The Great Britain eventing team also qualified by winning a silver medal at the same event.
Great Britain secured a full equestrian team for Rio when the British riders achieved one of three qualification places from the 2015 European Show Jumping Championships.

Dressage

Eventing

"#" indicates that the score of this rider does not count in the team competition, since only the best three results of a team are counted.

Jumping

"#" indicates that the score of this rider does not count in the team competition, since only the best three results of a team are counted.

Fencing

British fencers qualified a full squad in the men's team foil by virtue of being the highest ranking team from Europe outside the world's top four in the FIE Olympic Team Rankings. A trio of men's foil fencers, James Davis, Laurence Halsted and Richard Kruse, along with their reserve Marcus Mepstead, were named to Team GB on 5 May 2016. In the men's individual foil Kruse came close to winning Great Britain's first medal of the Games, and its first fencing medal since the 1964 Games, finishing fourth after losing the bronze medal match to Timur Safin of Russia.

Field hockey

Summary

Men's tournament

Great Britain's men's field hockey team qualified for the Olympics by having reached the last four at the 2014–15 Men's FIH Hockey World League Semifinals. Only three nations qualified through this route, but India had already secured qualification as continental champions after the team's success at the 2014 Asian Games, so that the remaining teams automatically received the three quotas.

Squad

Group play

Women's tournament

Great Britain's women's field hockey team qualified for the Olympics by having achieved a top three finish at the 2014–15 Women's FIH Hockey World League Semifinals. As England also won the 2015 Women's EuroHockey tournament, Great Britain were treated as having qualified as European champions, and relinquished their Hockey World League qualification place to the highest ranking non qualified team, India.

Squad

Group play

Quarterfinal

Semifinal

Gold medal match

Golf

Great Britain entered four golfers (two per gender) into the Olympic tournament. Justin Rose (world no. 11), Danny Willett (world no. 9), Charley Hull (world no. 27) and Catriona Matthew (world no. 63) qualified directly among the top 60 eligible players for their respective individual events based on the IGF World Rankings as of 11 July 2016.

Gymnastics

Artistic
Great Britain qualified a full squad of five gymnasts in both the men's and women's artistic gymnastics events through top eight finishes in the team all-around competitions at the 2015 World Artistic Gymnastics Championships in Glasgow. BOA announced the men's and women's artistic gymnastic squads, highlighted by London 2012 medalists Louis Smith and Max Whitlock, for the Games on July 12, 2016.

Men
Team

Individual finals

Women
Team

Individual finals

Trampoline
Great Britain qualified two gymnasts in the women's trampoline by virtue of a top eight finish at the 2015 World Championships in Odense, Denmark. Meanwhile, an Olympic berth was secured in the men's event by Nathan Bailey, who finished in the top six at the 2016 Olympic Test Event in Rio de Janeiro.

Judo

Great Britain qualified a total of seven judokas for each of the following weight classes at the Games. Six of them (McKenzie, Oates, Smythe-Davis, Schlesinger, Conway, and Powell) were ranked among the top 22 eligible judokas for men and top 14 for women in the IJF World Ranking List of 30 May 2016, while Benjamin Fletcher earned a continental quota spot from the European region as Great Britain's top-ranked judoka outside of direct qualifying position. Team GB officially announced the judo team on 16 June 2016.

Men

Women

Modern pentathlon

British athletes qualified for the following spots to compete in modern pentathlon. If more than two competitors qualified in either the men's or women's event, selection for the two places available to each gender was to be made by the British Olympic Association in conjunction with Pentathlon GB. Freyja Prentice became the third British woman to qualify for Rio as a result of her world ranking at the end of May 2016. As the two previously qualified athletes failed to guarantee their selection at the 2016 World Modern Pentathlon Championships, the choice of which two women would go to the Games was determined by the selectors before the team was named on 8 June; in the event, London 2012 silver medalist Samantha Murray and rookie Kate French were selected.

 * Promoted following the disqualification of a higher-ranked modern pentathlete for doping.

Rowing

Great Britain qualified twelve out of fourteen boats for each of the following rowing classes into the Olympic regatta, with the majority of crews (except women's single & quadruple sculls) having confirmed Olympic places for their boats at the 2015 FISA World Championships in Lac d'Aiguebelette, France. They also had to have competed at the British Rowing Olympic Trials in Caversham (March 21 to 23) to assure their selection to the Olympic team for the Games.

A total of 43 rowers were officially named to Team GB's Olympic squad on June 9, 2016, with double silver medalist Frances Houghton aiming to appear at her fifth Olympics and London 2012 bronze medalist Alan Campbell racing in the single sculls at his fourth. The crew also featured reigning Olympic champions Helen Glover and Heather Stanning from the women's pair, and two-time gold medalists Pete Reed and Andrew Triggs Hodge from the men's four. A squad of twelve rowers, not including cox Phelan Hill was announced for the men's eight; Team GB announced at the same time that the men's pair, and two 'spares' or reserves, would be selected at a later date from those members of the twelve that were not seated in the largest boat. Following the breaking up of the women's double sculls partnership of Katherine Grainger and Victoria Thornley, and their failure thereafter to make the women's eight squad, the double sculls was also not announced, although selector David Tanner confirmed later that evening that the pair of Grainger and Thornley would be selected.

Men

Women

Qualification Legend: FA=Final A (medal); FB=Final B (non-medal); FC=Final C (non-medal); FD=Final D (non-medal); FE=Final E (non-medal); FF=Final F (non-medal); SA/B=Semifinals A/B; SC/D=Semifinals C/D; SE/F=Semifinals E/F; QF=Quarterfinals; R=Repechage

Rugby sevens

In international competition the constituent nations of Great Britain ordinarily compete as separate unions representing England, Scotland and Wales. Northern Irish players who normally represent Ireland would have been eligible however the IRFU insisted that they do not play for Great Britain. For the purposes of qualification for the 2016 Olympics the three British unions agreed in advance of the 2013–14 men's and women's Sevens World Series that their highest-finishing teams in that season would represent all three unions in the first stage of qualification during the 2014–15 series. The England men's and women's teams earned the right to represent the British unions in that stage of their respective competitions.

Men's tournament

The England men's team secured a qualifying berth for Great Britain at the Olympics by having achieved one of the top four places in the 2014–15 Sevens World Series.

Squad

Group play

Quarterfinal

Semifinal

Gold medal match

Women's tournament

The England women's team secured a qualifying berth for Great Britain at the Olympics by having achieved one of the top four places in the 2014–15 World Rugby Women's Sevens Series.

Squad

Group play

Quarterfinal

Semifinal

Bronze medal match

Sailing

Great Britain qualified one boat for each of the following classes at the 2014 ISAF Sailing World Championships, bringing the maximum quota of 15 sailors, in ten boats. The sailors who secured the quotas for Great Britain were not necessarily the athletes who would be selected to represent their country in these events. On 9 September 2015, Team GB announced the names of the first six sailors to be selected for places at the Rio 2016 regatta. Five more sailors were added to the list of confirmed athletes for Rio on 8 March 2016, with the windsurfer Nick Dempsey appearing at his fifth Olympics. The men's 470 (Patience & Grube) and 49er (Fletcher & Sign) crews completed the Team GB's sailing lineup for the Olympics on 4 May 2016.

Men

Women

Mixed

M = Medal race; RDG = Redress given; EL = Eliminated – did not advance into the medal race

Shooting

British shooters achieved quota places for the following events by virtue of their best finishes at the 2014 and 2015 ISSF World Championships, the 2015 ISSF World Cup series, and European Championships or Games, as long as they obtained a minimum qualifying score (MQS) by March 31, 2016.

On 10 November 2015, Team GB announced the names of the six sport shooters to compete at the Games.

Qualification Legend: Q = Qualify for the next round; q = Qualify for the bronze medal (shotgun)

Swimming

British swimmers achieved qualifying standards in the following events (up to a maximum of 2 swimmers in each event at the Olympic Qualifying Time (OQT), or potentially 1 at the Olympic Selection Time (OST)): All British swimmers had to qualify by finishing in the top two of the Olympic trials having gained the GB qualifying A standard set by British Swimming in the relevant final (that time being the fastest time of the sixteenth fastest swimmer internationally in that event in 2015).

Great Britain secured its first spot for Rio 2016 when Jack Burnell finished fifth in the  open water marathon at the 2015 FINA World Championships. Meanwhile, in the pool, British swimmers earned places for Rio in all the relay events at the same meet with the exception of the women's 4 × 100 m freestyle relay; therefore, they will rely on the ranking times for one of the final four places available in these events.

On 21 April 2016, British Swimming announced the final squad of 26 swimmers for the Olympics. Among them were 2015 World champions Adam Peaty and James Guy, Commonwealth champion Jazmin Carlin, and incoming three-time Olympians Robbie Renwick and Hannah Miley.

Men

* – Indicates athlete swam in the preliminaries but not in the final race.
Qualifiers for the latter rounds (Q) of all events were decided on a time only basis, therefore positions shown are overall results versus competitors in all heats.

Women

Qualifiers for the latter rounds (Q) of all events were decided on a time only basis, therefore positions shown are overall results versus competitors in all heats.

Synchronized swimming

Great Britain was able to submit a squad of two synchronized swimmers to compete only in the women's duet, after picking up one of four spare berths freed by the continental selection for being the next highest ranking nation at the FINA Olympic test event in Rio de Janeiro. Katie Clark and Olivia Federici, who were both part of the Great Britain lineup for the team event at the 2012 Games, were confirmed as the British representatives in May 2016.

Table tennis

Great Britain qualified a team of three athletes for the table tennis competition at the Games. London 2012 Olympians Paul Drinkhall and Liam Pitchford were automatically selected among the top 22 eligible players in the men's singles based on the ITTF Olympic Rankings. On 3 June 2016, Sam Walker was named as the third member of the Great Britain team, with Tom Jarvis also named, as travelling reserve.

Taekwondo

Great Britain fielded a squad of four athletes into the taekwondo competition at the Olympics by finishing in the top 6 of the WTF Olympic rankings in their respective classes. Defending Olympic champion Jade Jones, and former World and reigning European champion Bianca Walkden qualified automatically for their respective weight classes. The quota secured in the men's 80 kg category could be allocated to either Lutalo Muhammad or Damon Sansum, and was at the discretion of British Taekwondo in collaboration with the British Olympic Association; in the event, the higher ranked Muhammad got the nod on 22 June 2016. The remaining British spot was awarded to Mahama Cho in the men's heavyweight category (+80 kg) by virtue of his top two finish at the 2016 European Qualification Tournament in Istanbul, Turkey.

Tennis

Great Britain entered four tennis players into the Olympic tournament. Reigning Olympic champion Andy Murray (world no. 2), along with returning Olympian Heather Watson (world no. 56) from London 2012 and rookie Johanna Konta (world no. 18), qualified directly among the top 56 eligible players for their respective singles events based on the ATP and WTA World Rankings as of 6 June 2016. Murray also teamed up with his older brother Jamie in the men's doubles by virtue of the latter's top-10 ATP ranking.

On 1 July 2016, the International Tennis Federation announced that further places would be allocated to Kyle Edmund in the men's singles, and the pair of Colin Fleming and Dominic Inglot in the men's doubles.

Men

Women

Mixed

Triathlon

British triathletes qualified for the following events at the 2016 Olympic Games. Gordon Benson secured a quota in the men's triathlon event as a result of winning the gold medal at the 2015 European Games, while Non Stanford and Vicky Holland added two more quotas to the British team in the women's triathlon event by finishing second and third at the ITU World Qualification Event in Rio de Janeiro. Stanford and Holland then assured themselves places on the British team in accordance with the selection criteria set by the British Triathlon Federation, by finishing second and third in the ITU World Triathlon Grand Final in Chicago. Two times world champion Helen Jenkins was confirmed as the third British athlete for the women's event over Commonwealth Games champion Jodie Stimpson, following victory for Jenkins in the World Triathlon Series event in Gold Coast, Australia, used by Great Britain as a selection event, and brothers Alistair and Jonathan Brownlee, who both won medals at the previous Games, were chosen for the men's event. European Games gold medalist Gordon Benson was the last triathlete to be selected for the Games on 7 June 2016, selected to fill the quota place he had won for Great Britain at those Games.

Weightlifting

Great Britain qualified one male and one female weightlifter for the Rio Olympics by virtue of a top seven national finish (for men) and top six (for women), respectively, at the 2016 European Championships. The team were required to allocate these places to individual athletes by 20 June 2016.

First-time Olympians Sonny Webster and Rebekah Tiler were named to Team GB's weightlifting team for the Games on 29 June 2016.

Sports not contested by Great Britain in Rio

Basketball

Neither the men's nor the women's team qualified. The men's team failed to qualify for the finals of EuroBasket from which European qualification was made, while the women finished last in their EuroBasket Women 2015 group to leave both the Eurobasket competition and Olympic qualification.

Football

Following the appearance of a British team in both the men's and women's tournaments as the nation hosted the 2012 Summer Olympics in London, the Football Association initially indicated it was unlikely that a men's team would be entered to take part in the Rio Olympics as the component nations of Great Britain were to compete separately in the men's 2015 European Under-21 Championship which acted as the qualifying competition. However, in February 2015, the FA indicated a change in its policy, championed by Gareth Southgate, the England under-21 coach, who held the view that, as the only global tournament for that age group (there is no FIFA under 21/under 23 World Cup), the Olympic tournament would provide valuable experience for the players. As a consequence, the FA indicated its willingness to the BOA to run a men's team for the Olympic Games.

England women's national football team qualified for the 2015 FIFA Women's World Cup but is not an Olympic member nation, as they are part of Great Britain. Although England were one of the top three European teams, the last Olympic spot went to the fourth-best UEFA team. The Football Association had originally declared on 2 March 2015 its intention to enter and run teams on behalf of the British Olympic Association at the 2016 Olympics should England qualify. However, following strong objections from the Scottish, Welsh and Northern Irish football associations, as well as a commitment from FIFA that they would not allow entry of a British team unless all four Home Nations were in agreement, the Football Association announced on 30 March 2015 that they would not seek entry into the Olympic tournament.

Handball

Team GB did not qualify.

Volleyball

Team GB had no qualified teams.

Water polo

Team GB did not qualify.

Wrestling

Great Britain did not qualify any athletes.

See also
Great Britain at the 2016 Summer Paralympics

References

External links

 Team GB official website
 

Olympics
2016
Nations at the 2016 Summer Olympics